Balance is the seventh studio album by Dutch DJ and record producer Armin van Buuren. It was released on 25 October 2019 through Armada Music, succeeding his 2015 album Embrace. It was also released as a double album with each part consisting of 14 tracks. It features collaborations with Above & Beyond, BT, Lucas & Steve, Garibay, Inner City, Shapov, Rudimental, Tempo Giusto, Ne-Yo and Haliene.

Critical reception
Rachel Narozniak from Dancing Astronaut wrote that Balance "emblematizes the artistic diligence" driving van Buuren since his debut appearance, while comprising a "broad assembly of dance styles, anthemic chord progressions, vocal-centric constructions, and ear-catching lyrical concepts and hooks". She praised the variety of both dance-pop and trance tracks within the album, which Narozniak felt showed van Buuren's willingness to go beyond his "sonic comfort zone" of producing traditional trance music.

Track listing
Track details and metadata adapted from Apple Music.

Charts

Certifications

References

2019 albums
Armin van Buuren albums
Armada Music albums